Cooma–Snowy Mountains Airport  is an airport located  southwest Cooma, New South Wales, Australia. The airport serves the town of Cooma and the resorts of the Snowy Mountains and Australian Alps. The airport experiences increased traffic during the winter months.

Airlines and destinations

See also
List of airports in New South Wales

References

External links
Snowy Mountains Airport official site

Airports in New South Wales